The 2004 Speedway World Cup Event 1 was the first race of the 2004 Speedway World Cup season. It took place on August 2, 2004 in the Arlington Stadium in Eastbourne, Great Britain.

Results

Heat details

References

See also 
 2004 Speedway World Cup
 motorcycle speedway

E1